Giorgio Damilano (born 6 April 1957 in Scarnafigi, Italy) is an Italian former race walker.

He is the twin brother of Italian race walker legend Maurizio Damilano and brother of the coach Sandro Damilano.

Biography
He was 11th at the 1980 Summer Olympics held in Moscow, Sovietic Union.  He also won a National championships in 20 km walk (1979).

In 1999, Maurizio Damilano and Giorgio Damilano founded Fit Walking.

Giorgio Damilano is one of the coaches of the Saluzzo Race Walking School, created by the town of Saluzzo in 2002, the school is also the center for the diffusion of Fit Walking and training center of international race walking.

Achievements

National titles
1 win in 20 km walk at the Italian Athletics Championships (1979)

See also
Saluzzo Race Walking School
Fit Walking

References

External links
 

1957 births
Living people
Sportspeople from the Province of Cuneo
Italian athletics coaches
Italian male racewalkers
Athletes (track and field) at the 1980 Summer Olympics
Olympic athletes of Italy